Southeast Division Street station is a light rail station on the MAX Green Line in Portland, Oregon. It is the 2nd stop southbound on the I-205 MAX branch.

The station is located at the intersection of Interstate 205 and Division Street, and offers connections to the I-205 Bike Path. It is adjacent to the I-205 exit ramps to Powell Boulevard. This station has a center platform.

Bus connections 
This station by the l-205 ramps to Powell Boulevard is served by the following bus line:
FX2–Division

Gallery

External links 
Station information (with northbound ID number) from TriMet
Station information (with southbound ID number) from TriMet
MAX Light Rail Stations – more general TriMet page

MAX Light Rail stations
MAX Green Line
2009 establishments in Oregon
South
Railway stations in Portland, Oregon